Paradiski is a ski-area in the Tarentaise Valley of France that offers uninterrupted skiing in between the areas of Les Arcs, Peisey-Vallandry and La Plagne. The area is linked, since December 2003, by the Vanoise Express lift.

Well known neighbour ski areas are Espace Killy (Val d'Isère and Tignes) and Les Trois Vallées (Courchevel, Meribel, Val Thorens and more). Lift tickets can span across all the areas. There were plans to interlink all resorts, creating the largest ski area in the world, however that vision ended due to the creation of the Vanoise National Park.

External links
 Official website
 Interactive piste map
 Useful Information about Paradiski
 OpenSnowMap

Ski areas in France
Tourist attractions in Savoie